Ho Bong-chol (born 21 August 1959) is a North Korean weightlifter. He competed in the men's flyweight event at the 1980 Summer Olympics, winning the silver medal.

References

1959 births
Living people
North Korean male weightlifters
Olympic weightlifters of North Korea
Weightlifters at the 1980 Summer Olympics
Place of birth missing (living people)
Olympic silver medalists for North Korea
Olympic medalists in weightlifting
Medalists at the 1980 Summer Olympics
20th-century North Korean people
21st-century North Korean people